Soyuz TMA-19M was a 2015 Russian Soyuz spaceflight to the International Space Station. It was launched on December 15, 2015 from Baikonur Cosmodrome, transporting three members of the Expedition 46 crew to the International Space Station. TMA-19M was the 128th flight of a Soyuz spacecraft since the first in 1967. The crew consisted of a Russian commander accompanied by American and British astronauts. The flight returned to Earth on June 18, 2016. The Soyuz TMA-19M descent module is now in the collection of the UK's Science Museum Group.

Crew

Backup crew

Mission highlights

Soyuz TMA-19M was launched atop of a Soyuz-FG rocket at 11:03:09 UTC on 15 December 2015 from the Baikonur Cosmodrome, Kazakhstan. Following the launch, the Soyuz spacecraft successfully achieved orbital insertion 9 minutes later and began its 4-orbit journey to the Space Station. Unusually, while docking, the Kurs docking navigation system failed, and a manual docking had to be performed by Yuri Malenchenko. This delayed docking with the ISS by 10 minutes. The Soyuz docked with the ISS at 17:33:29 UTC the same day. The crew then boarded the ISS at 19:58 UTC.

Soyuz TMA-19M undocked on June 18, 2016 at 5:52 UTC, after being docked for 186 days. The crew landed safely in Kazakhstan, southeast of the town of Dzhezkazgan on 09:15 UTC.

See also

 2015 in spaceflight

References

External links

 TMA-19M descent module in the Science Museum Group Collection website
 Soyuz TMA-19M Real Time Tracking

Crewed Soyuz missions
Spacecraft launched in 2015
2015 in Russia
Spacecraft which reentered in 2016
Spacecraft launched by Soyuz-FG rockets